Fallen Is Babylon is the ninth album by Ziggy Marley and the Melody Makers, released in 1997. It won a Grammy award in the category of Best Reggae Album, and achieved commercial success with its single, "People Get Ready", produced by Michael Barbiero and Steve Thompson.

Track listing

References 

Ziggy Marley and the Melody Makers albums
1997 albums
Elektra Records albums
Grammy Award for Best Reggae Album